Pentecost is a populated place located in Sunflower County, Mississippi, on US Route 49.

References

Former populated places in Sunflower County, Mississippi
Former populated places in Mississippi